{{DISPLAYTITLE:C7H12O3}}
The molecular formula C7H12O3 (molar mass: 144.17 g/mol, exact mass: 144.0786 u) may refer to:

 Botryodiplodin
 Ethyl levulinate
 Tetrahydrofurfuryl acetate

Molecular formulas